Stone is a constituency represented in the House of Commons of the UK Parliament since its 1997 recreation by Bill Cash, a Conservative.

Members of Parliament

MPs 1918–1950

MPs since 1997

Constituency profile
This is a mostly rural seat to the south of the Stoke-on-Trent conurbation. Electoral Calculus describes the seat as "Strong Right" characterised by retired, socially conservative voters who strongly supported Brexit.

Boundaries 

Stone is in the top decile in geographical size in England.  It covers the area from Madeley in the north to the west of Newcastle-under-Lyme, then runs south and out to the outskirts of Market Drayton, running down to the northern edge of Newport.  The boundary heads north alongside the western boundary of Stafford around the north of Stafford and down its eastern boundary.  It runs across the north of Abbots Bromley before reaching its eastern end.  It continues to the west of Uttoxeter in the Burton constituency.  It then extends eastwards between the Burton constituency and up to Cheadle and to the south of Stoke-on-Trent.  Currently within the constituency are the towns of Eccleshall, Cheadle and Stone.

2010–present: The Borough of Stafford wards of Barlaston and Oulton, Chartley, Church Eaton, Eccleshall, Fulford, Gnosall and Woodseaves, Milwich, St Michael's, Stonefield and Christchurch, Swynnerton, and Walton, the District of Staffordshire Moorlands wards of Cheadle North East, Cheadle South East, Cheadle West, Checkley, and Forsbrook, and the Borough of Newcastle-under-Lyme wards of Loggerheads and Whitmore, and Madeley.

1997–2010: The Borough of Stafford wards of Barlaston, Chartley, Church Eaton, Eccleshall, Fulford, Gnosall, Milwich, Oulton, St Michael's, Stonefield and Christchurch, Swynnerton, Walton, and Woodseaves, the District of Staffordshire Moorlands wards of Alton, Cheadle North East, Cheadle South East, Cheadle West, Checkley, Forsbrook, and Kingsley, and the Borough of Newcastle-under-Lyme wards of Loggerheads, Madeley, and Whitmore.

1918–1950: The Urban District of Stone, and the Rural Districts of Blore Heath, Cheadle, Mayfield, Newcastle-under-Lyme, and Stone.

There were various alterations to the constituency shape in boundary changes put in place for the 2010 general election. Stone took the areas covered by the Bradley, and Salt and Enson civil parish from the neighbouring Stafford constituency. In turn, the parishes of Hixon, Ellenhall, and Ranton, were moved back from Stone to Stafford. In the largest alteration, the north-eastern parishes covering Kingsley, Oakamoor, Alton, Farley, and Cotton, were all moved to the altered Staffordshire Moorlands.

History
The earlier constituency of the same name that existed 1918-1950 elected Conservatives, all three officers who had fought with some distinction in either of the two World Wars.

The current constituency was created for the 1997 general election, when Parliament approved for Staffordshire the additional seat proposed by the Boundary Commission. The constituency was formed from parts of the Stafford, Staffordshire Moorlands and Mid Staffordshire.

Presenting a safe seat for the Conservatives and proving to be one, its creation reduced the Conservative majority in the Staffordshire Moorlands and Stafford constituencies, both of which were gained by a Labour Party member at the 1997 general election.

Elections

Elections in the 2010s

Elections in the 2000s

Election in the 1990s

Election in the 1940s

Elections in the 1930s

Elections in the 1920s

Election in the 1910s

See also 
 List of parliamentary constituencies in Staffordshire

Notes

References

Sources 

Parliamentary constituencies in Staffordshire
Borough of Stafford
Politics of the Borough of Newcastle-under-Lyme
Staffordshire Moorlands
Constituencies of the Parliament of the United Kingdom established in 1918
Constituencies of the Parliament of the United Kingdom disestablished in 1950
Constituencies of the Parliament of the United Kingdom established in 1997